Marikana Land Occupation may refer to:

 Marikana land occupation (Cape Town), in the township of Philippi East
 Marikana land occupation (Durban) in the township of Cato Crest
 Marikana miners' strike and their occupation of the koppie during the strike